Menelaus of Macedon (Menelaos) may refer to:

Menelaus, father of Amyntas II or Amyntas III king and grandfather of Philip, according to Justin (vii. 4) and Aelian ( V. H. xii. 43). But there is much discrepancy on this point: Dexippus (ap. Syncell. p. 263, a.) calls the father of Amyntas III as Arrhidaeus; and Diodorus (xv. 60), Tharraleos. Justin represents him as brother of Alexander I which seems a gross error. (See Clinton, F. ff, vol. ii. p. 225.)
Menelaus (son of Amyntas III) by his second wife. He was put to death by his stepbrother Philip II in 347 BC
Menelaus (son of Lagus) priest, general and brother of Ptolemy I Soter
Menelaus, father of the cavalry officer Philip (son of Menelaus)
Menelaus of Pelagonia honoured in Athens

References

Ancient Macedonians